SN Applied Sciences is a peer-reviewed scientific journal that publishes papers from all areas of applied science. It was established in 2019 and is published by Springer Science+Business Media. The journal publishes research articles, reviews, case studies, and short communications. The managing editors are Chris Poole, Thomas von Larcher, and Nastaran Ranjbar Sahraie.

Abstracting and indexing
The journal is abstracted and indexed in:
Ei Compendex
Emerging Sources Citation Index
Food Science & Technology Abstracts
Inspec
Scopus

References

External links

English-language journals
Springer Science+Business Media academic journals
Monthly journals
Applied sciences
Multidisciplinary scientific journals